Latvijas Kareivis was an official daily newspaper of the Latvian Army from February 1, 1920, to August 9, 1940.

It was initially published 3 times in a week, but from March 7, 1920, it was published six times in a week. At the beginning Latvijas Kareivis was 2 pages long, but later in some circulations it consisted of 32  pages. Its content consisted of various topics related to the military as official documents from Ministry of Defense and headquarters, stories about Latvian War of Independence, there also were discussed questions about politics, social life and army.

Literature 
 Latvijas Brīvības cīņas 1918 — 1920. Enciklopēdija. Rīga:Preses nams, 1999. 

Newspapers established in 1920
Publications disestablished in 1940
Latvian-language newspapers
Defunct newspapers published in Latvia
Mass media in Riga